Robert B. Rascoe (born July 22, 1940) is an American former basketball player. He played in the American Basketball Association (ABA) with the Kentucky Colonels.

On December 29, 2012, Western Kentucky University honored Rascoe's accomplishments by retiring his jersey in the rafters of EA Diddle Arena.

References

1940 births
Living people
American men's basketball players
Basketball players from Kentucky
Kentucky Colonels players
New York Knicks draft picks
Phillips 66ers players
Shooting guards
Small forwards
Western Kentucky Hilltoppers basketball players